The Dominican Chess Championship is currently organized by the Dominican Chess Federation, whose current incarnation dates back to 1965. The first national championship was held in 1926 and the first women's championship was held in 1977.

Open championship winners

{| class="sortable wikitable"
! Year !! Champion
|-
| 1926 || Gilberto Gómez
|-
| 1928 || Antinoe Fiallo
|-
| 1934 || José Arjonilla
|-
| 1940 ||José Arjonilla
|-
| 1940 || José de Jesús Jiménez
|-
| 1944 || Juan Bonetti
|-
| 1953 || Alberto Malagón
|-
| 1955 || Frank Sánchez
|-
| 1958 ||Frank Sánchez
|-
| 1963 || Gustavo Peña
|-
| 1966 || Freddy Yabra
|-
| 1968 ||Alberto Malagón
|-
| 1969 ||César Malagón
|-
| 1970 || Luís Belliard
|-
| 1971 ||Luís Belliard
|-
| 1972 || Eliseo González
|-
| 1973 || Alberto Delgado
|-
| 1974 || César Juliao
|-
| 1975 || David Abréu
|-
| 1976 ||Alberto Delgado
|-
| 1977 ||Alberto Delgado
|-
| 1978 ||David Abréu
|-
| 1979 || 
|-
| 1980 || Franklin Alvarez
|-
| 1981 ||Eliseo González
|-
| 1982 ||David Abréu
|-
| 1983 || Yuan Eu Liao
|-
| 1984 ||Yuan Eu Liao
|-
| 1985 ||Eliseo González
|-
| 1986 ||Ramón Mateo
|-
| 1987 || Gustavo Hernández
|-
| 1988 ||Gustavo Hernández
|-
| 1990 || José Manuel Domínguez
|-
| 1991 ||José Manuel Domínguez
|-
| 1992 ||José Manuel Domínguez
|- 
| 1993 || Marino Fernández
|-
| 1994 || Juan Manuel Jaquez
|- 
| 1995 ||Marino Fernández
|-
| 1996 || Fernando Cabrera
|-
| 1997 || William Puntier
|- 
| 1998 || Gustavo Hernández
|-
| 1999 ||José Manuel Domínguez
|-
| 2000 ||Ramón Mateo
|-
| 2001 ||William Puntier
|-
| 2002 ||Ramón Mateo
|-
| 2003 ||Ramón Mateo
|-
| 2004 ||Ramón Mateo
|-
| 2005 || Nelson Alvarado
|-
| 2006 || Lisandro Muñoz
|-
| 2007 ||José Manuel Domínguez
|-
| 2008 ||José Manuel Domínguez
|-
| 2009 ||Lisandro Muñoz
|-
| 2010 ||Ramón Mateo
|-
| 2011 || Miguel Infante
|-
| 2012 ||Lisandro Muñoz
|-
| 2013 ||William Puntier
|-
| 2014 ||Lisandro Muñoz
|-
| 2015 ||José Manuel Domínguez
|-
| 2016 ||Lisandro Muñoz
|-
| 2017 ||Lisandro Muñoz
|-
| 2018 ||Carlos Paúl Abreu
|-
| 2019 || Francis Fernández Paulino
|}

Women's championship winners

{| class="sortable wikitable"
! Year !! Champion
|-
| 1977 || Marvin González
|-
| 1978 || Alba Rosa Mariano
|-
| 1979 || Ana Esther García
|-
| 1980 ||Ana Esther García
|-
| 1981 ||Ana Esther García
|-
| 1982 || Polonia Guzmán
|-
| 1983 || Sayonara Báez
|-
| 1984 ||Sayonara Báez
|-
| 1985 || Eneida Pérez
|-
| 1986 ||Eneida Pérez
|-
| 1987 ||Eneida Pérez
|-
| 1988 ||Eneida Pérez
|-
| 1990 ||Ana Esther García
|-
| 1991 ||Polonia Guzmán
|-
| 1992 || Susan Pérez
|- 
| 1993 ||Ana Esther García
|-
| 1994 ||Ana Esther García
|- 
| 1995 ||Ana Esther García
|-
| 1996 || Rosmery Espinal
|-
| 1997 ||Ana Esther García
|- 
| 1998 ||Ana Esther García
|-
| 1999 || Mercedes de la Crúz
|-
| 2000 ||Ana Esther García
|-
| 2001 ||Ana Esther García
|-
| 2002 ||Eneida Pérez
|-
| 2003 ||Eneida Pérez
|-
| 2004 || Kenia José Polanco
|-
| 2005 ||Mercedes de la Crúz
|-
| 2006 ||Mercedes de la Crúz
|-
| 2007 ||Mercedes de la Crúz
|-
| 2008 ||Kenia José Polanco
|-
| 2009 || Omaira Aybar
|-
| 2010 || Ariella Adames
|-
| 2011 ||Eneida Pérez
|-
| 2012 || Doribel Muñoz
|-
| 2013 || Wilsaida Díaz
|-
| 2014 || Elizabeth Hazim
|-
| 2015 ||Wilsaida Díaz
|-
| 2016 ||Wilsaida Díaz
|-
| 2017 ||Jennifer María Almánzar Vásquez
|-
| 2018 ||Patricia Castillo Peña
|-
| 2019 ||Patricia Castillo Peña
|-
| 2021 ||Patricia Castillo Peña
|-
| 2022 ||[[Raydily Rosario Almánzar ]]
|}

References

Chess national championships
Women's chess national championships
Chess in the Dominican Republic
Chess
Recurring sporting events established in 1926
Recurring sporting events established in 1977
Chess
Chess
1926 in chess
1977 in chess